Brady J. K. Rush is a New Zealand rugby sevens and rugby union player who plays for  in the Bunnings NPC. His position is Wing or Fullback.

Career 
Rush was named as a contracted player for the All Blacks Sevens squad in 2021. He was named in the team for the 2022 Singapore Sevens and was to make his debut at the tournament. He was named as a non travelling reserve for the All Blacks Sevens squad for the 2022 Commonwealth Games in Birmingham.

Personal life 
Brady is the son of New Zealand sevens legend Eric Rush.

References

External links
itsrugby.co.uk profile
 Brady Rush at All Blacks.com

New Zealand rugby union players
Living people
Rugby union wings
Rugby union fullbacks
Northland rugby union players
1999 births